Major's was a large-format discount department store at Forest and Grandview avenues on Staten Island. Its logo featured a distinctive drum major.

References

Defunct department stores based in New York City
Variety stores